Huang Yi-hua (born 20 July 1984) is a Taiwanese table tennis player.

Career records
Singles
Olympics: round of 32 (2012).
World Championships: round of 32 (2009, 2013).
World Cup appearances: 1. Record: 9-12th (2010).
Asian Games: round of 16 (2002, 2006, 2010).
Asian Championships: round of 16 (2003, 05).
Asian Cup: 5th (2010).

Women's doubles
Olympics: round of 16 (2004).
World Championships: round of 16 (2003, 05, 11, 13).
Pro Tour winner (2): India Open 2010, Poland Open 2012. Runner-up (5): Japan Open 2010, 2013; China Open 2011, 2014; UAE Open 2013.
Pro Tour Grand Finals appearances: 7. Record: Runner-up (1): 2012 
Asian Games: SF (2006).

Mixed doubles
World Championships: QF (2013).
Asian Championships: QF (2009).

Team
World Championships: SF (2022).

References

External links
 
 

1984 births
Living people
Asian Games medalists in table tennis
Olympic table tennis players of Taiwan
Sportspeople from Tainan
Table tennis players at the 2004 Summer Olympics
Table tennis players at the 2008 Summer Olympics
Table tennis players at the 2012 Summer Olympics
Table tennis players at the 2016 Summer Olympics
Table tennis players at the 2002 Asian Games
Table tennis players at the 2006 Asian Games
Table tennis players at the 2010 Asian Games
Table tennis players at the 2014 Asian Games
Universiade medalists in table tennis
Taiwanese female table tennis players
Medalists at the 2006 Asian Games
Asian Games bronze medalists for Chinese Taipei
Universiade bronze medalists for Chinese Taipei
Universiade gold medalists for Chinese Taipei
Medalists at the 2007 Summer Universiade
Medalists at the 2011 Summer Universiade
World Table Tennis Championships medalists
21st-century Taiwanese women